Naturally occurring scandium (21Sc) is composed of one stable isotope, 45Sc. Twenty-five radioisotopes have been characterized, with the most stable being 46Sc with a half-life of 83.8 days, 47Sc with a half-life of 3.35 days, and 48Sc with a half-life of 43.7 hours and 44Sc with a half-life of 3.97 hours. All the remaining isotopes have half-lives that are less than four hours, and the majority of these have half-lives that are less than two minutes, the least stable being proton unbound 39Sc with a half-life shorter than 300 nanoseconds. This element also has 13 meta states with the most stable being 44m2Sc (t1/2 58.6 h).

The isotopes of scandium range in atomic weight from 38 u (36Sc) to 62 u (62Sc). The primary decay mode at masses lower than the only stable isotope, 45Sc, is beta-plus or electron capture, and the primary mode at masses above it is beta-minus. The primary decay products at atomic weights below 45Sc are calcium isotopes and the primary products from higher atomic weights are titanium isotopes.

List of isotopes 

|-
| 39Sc
| style="text-align:right" | 21
| style="text-align:right" | 18
| 38.984790(26)
| <300 ns
| p
| 38Ca
| (7/2−)#
|
|
|-
| rowspan=3|40Sc
| rowspan=3 style="text-align:right" | 21
| rowspan=3 style="text-align:right" | 19
| rowspan=3|39.977967(3)
| rowspan=3|182.3(7) ms
| β+ (99.54%)
| 40Ca
| rowspan=3|4-
| rowspan=3|
| rowspan=3|
|-
| β+, p (.44%)
| 39K
|-
| β+, α (.017%)
| 36Ar
|-
| 41Sc
| style="text-align:right" | 21
| style="text-align:right" | 20
| 40.96925113(24)
| 596.3(17) ms
| β+
| 41Ca
| 7/2−
|
|
|-
| 42Sc
| style="text-align:right" | 21
| style="text-align:right" | 21
| 41.96551643(29)
| 681.3(7) ms
| β+
| 42Ca
| 0+
|
|
|-
| style="text-indent:1em" | 42mSc
| colspan="3" style="text-indent:2em" | 616.28(6) keV
| 61.7(4) s
| β+
| 42Ca
| (7, 5, 6)+
|
|
|-
| 43Sc
| style="text-align:right" | 21
| style="text-align:right" | 22
| 42.9611507(20)
| 3.891(12) h
| β+
| 43Ca
| 7/2−
|
|
|-
| style="text-indent:1em" | 43m1Sc
| colspan="3" style="text-indent:2em" | 151.4(2) keV
| 438(7) μs
|
|
| 3/2+
|
|
|-
| style="text-indent:1em" | 43m2Sc
| colspan="3" style="text-indent:2em" | 3123.2(3) keV
| 470(4) ns
|
|
| (19/2)−
|
|
|-
| 44Sc
| style="text-align:right" | 21
| style="text-align:right" | 23
| 43.9594028(19)
| 3.97(4) h
| β+
| 44Ca
| 2+
|
|
|-
| style="text-indent:1em" | 44m1Sc
| colspan="3" style="text-indent:2em" | 67.8680(14) keV
| 154.2(8) ns
|
|
| 1−
|
|
|-
| rowspan=2 style="text-indent:1em" | 44m2Sc
| rowspan=2 colspan="3" style="text-indent:2em" | 270.95(20) keV
| rowspan=2|58.61(10) h
| IT (98.8%)
| 44Sc
| rowspan=2| 6+
| rowspan=2| 
| rowspan=2|
|-
| β+ (1.2%)
| 44Ca
|-
| style="text-indent:1em" | 44m3Sc
| colspan="3" style="text-indent:2em" | 146.224(22) keV
| 50.4(7) μs
|
|
| 0-
|
|
|-
| 45Sc
| style="text-align:right" | 21
| style="text-align:right" | 24
| 44.9559119(9)
| colspan=3 align=center|Stable
| 7/2−
| 1.0000
|
|-
| style="text-indent:1em" | 45mSc
| colspan="3" style="text-indent:2em" | 12.40(5) keV
| 318(7) ms
| IT
| 45Sc
| 3/2+
|
|
|-
| 46Sc
| style="text-align:right" | 21
| style="text-align:right" | 25
| 45.9551719(9)
| 83.79(4) d
| β−
| 46Ti
| 4+
|
|
|-
| style="text-indent:1em" | 46m1Sc
| colspan="3" style="text-indent:2em" | 52.011(1) keV
| 9.4(8) μs
|
|
| 6+
|
|
|-
| style="text-indent:1em" | 46m2Sc
| colspan="3" style="text-indent:2em" | 142.528(7) keV
| 18.75(4) s
| IT
| 46Sc
| 1−
|
|
|-
| 47Sc
| style="text-align:right" | 21
| style="text-align:right" | 26
| 46.9524075(22)
| 3.3492(6) d
| β−
| 47Ti
| 7/2−
|
|
|-
| style="text-indent:1em" | 47mSc
| colspan="3" style="text-indent:2em" | 766.83(9) keV
| 272(8) ns
|
|
| (3/2)+
|
|
|-
| 48Sc
| style="text-align:right" | 21
| style="text-align:right" | 27
| 47.952231(6)
| 43.67(9) h
| β−
| 48Ti
| 6+
|
|
|-
| 49Sc
| style="text-align:right" | 21
| style="text-align:right" | 28
| 48.950024(4)
| 57.2(2) min
| β−
| 49Ti
| 7/2−
|
|
|-
| 50Sc
| style="text-align:right" | 21
| style="text-align:right" | 29
| 49.952188(17)
| 102.5(5) s
| β−
| 50Ti
| 5+
|
|
|-
| rowspan=2 style="text-indent:1em" | 50mSc
| rowspan=2 colspan="3" style="text-indent:2em" | 256.895(10) keV
| rowspan=2|350(40) ms
| IT (97.5%)
| 50Sc
| rowspan=2|2+, 3+
| rowspan=2|
| rowspan=2|
|-
| β− (2.5%)
| 50Ti
|-
| 51Sc
| style="text-align:right" | 21
| style="text-align:right" | 30
| 50.953603(22)
| 12.4(1) s
| β−
| 51Ti
| (7/2)−
|
|
|-
| 52Sc
| style="text-align:right" | 21
| style="text-align:right" | 31
| 51.95668(21)
| 8.2(2) s
| β−
| 52Ti
| 3(+)
|
|
|-
| rowspan=2|53Sc
| rowspan=2 style="text-align:right" | 21
| rowspan=2 style="text-align:right" | 32
| rowspan=2|52.95961(32)#
| rowspan=2|2.4(0.6) s
| β− (>99.9%)
| 53Ti
| rowspan=2|(7/2−)#
| rowspan=2|
| rowspan=2|
|-
| β−, n (<.1%)
| 52Ti
|-
| rowspan=2|54Sc
| rowspan=2 style="text-align:right" | 21
| rowspan=2 style="text-align:right" | 33
| rowspan=2|53.96326(40)
| rowspan=2|260(30) ms
| β− (>99.9%)
| 54Ti
| rowspan=2|3+#
| rowspan=2|
| rowspan=2|
|-
| β−, n (<.1%)
| 53Ti
|-
| style="text-indent:1em" | 54mSc
| colspan="3" style="text-indent:2em" | 110(3) keV
| 7(5) μs
|
|
| (5+)
|
|
|-
| rowspan=2|55Sc
| rowspan=2 style="text-align:right" | 21
| rowspan=2 style="text-align:right" | 34
| rowspan=2|54.96824(79)
| rowspan=2|0.115(15) s
| β− (>99.9%)
| 55Ti
| rowspan=2|7/2−#
| rowspan=2|
| rowspan=2|
|-
| β−, n (<.1%)
| 54Ti
|-
| 56Sc
| style="text-align:right" | 21
| style="text-align:right" | 35
| 55.97287(75)#
| 35(5) ms
| β−
| 56Ti
| (1+)
|
|
|-
| 57Sc
| style="text-align:right" | 21
| style="text-align:right" | 36
| 56.97779(75)#
| 13(4) ms
| β−
| 57Ti
| 7/2−#
|
|
|-
| 58Sc
| style="text-align:right" | 21
| style="text-align:right" | 37
| 57.98371(86)#
| 12(5) ms
| β−
| 58Ti
| (3+)#
|
|
|-
| rowspan=2|59Sc
| rowspan=2 style="text-align:right" | 21
| rowspan=2 style="text-align:right" | 38
| rowspan=2|58.98922(97)#
| rowspan=2|10# ms
| β−, n
| 58Ti
| rowspan=2|7/2−#
| rowspan=2|
| rowspan=2|
|-
| β−
| 59Ti
|-
| rowspan=3|60Sc
| rowspan=3 style="text-align:right" | 21
| rowspan=3 style="text-align:right" | 39
| rowspan=3|59.99571(97)#
| rowspan=3|3# ms (>620 ns)
| β−
| 60Ti
| rowspan=3|3+#
| rowspan=3|
| rowspan=3|
|-
| β−, n
| 59Ti
|-
| β−, 2n
| 58Ti
|-
| rowspan=3|61Sc
| rowspan=3 style="text-align:right" | 21
| rowspan=3 style="text-align:right" | 40
| rowspan=3|61.001(600)#
| rowspan=3|2# ms (>620 ns)
| β−
| 61Ti
| rowspan=3|7/2-#
| rowspan=3|
| rowspan=3|
|-
| β−, n
| 60Ti
|-
| β−, 2n
| 59Ti
|-
| rowspan=3|62Sc
| rowspan=3 style="text-align:right" | 21
| rowspan=3 style="text-align:right" | 41
| rowspan=3|62.00785(64)#
| rowspan=3|2# ms (>400 ns)
| β−?
| 62Ti
| rowspan=3|
| rowspan=3|
| rowspan=3|
|-
| β−, n?
| 61Ti
|-
| β−, 2n?
| 60Ti

References 

 Isotope masses from:

 Isotopic compositions and standard atomic masses from:

 Half-life, spin, and isomer data selected from the following sources.

 
Scandium
Scandium